Royal Mottos may refer to:
Royal mottos of British monarchs
Royal mottos of Danish monarchs
Royal mottos of Norwegian monarchs
Royal mottos of Swedish monarchs